Mount Muir is a peak in the Sierra Nevada of California, United States.

Mount Muir may also refer to:
 Mount Muir (Alaska), United States
 Mount Muir (Canadian Rockies), a mountain in Alberta/British Columbia, Canada
 Mount Muir (Vancouver Island), a mountain in British Columbia, Canada